This is a list of number-one popular singles on the Billboard Brasil Hot Popular chart in 2009. Note that Billboard publishes a monthly chart. The first number-one single on the chart was "Amor Não Vai Faltar" by Bruno e Marrone.

Chart history

See also 

 List of Hot 100 number-one singles of 2009 (Brazil)
 List of number-one popular hits of 2010 (Brazil)

References 

Brazil popular
2009 popular